Bees are winged insects closely related to wasps and ants, known for their roles in pollination and, in the case of the best-known bee species, the western honey bee, for producing honey. Bees are a monophyletic lineage within the superfamily Apoidea. They are presently considered a clade, called Anthophila. There are over 16,000 known species of bees in seven recognized biological families. Some speciesincluding honey bees, bumblebees, and stingless beeslive socially in colonies while most species (>90%)including mason bees, carpenter bees, leafcutter bees, and sweat beesare solitary.

Bees are found on every continent except Antarctica, in every habitat on the planet that contains insect-pollinated flowering plants. The most common bees in the Northern Hemisphere are the Halictidae, or sweat bees, but they are small and often mistaken for wasps or flies.

Bees feed on nectar and pollen, the former primarily as an energy source and the latter primarily for protein and other nutrients. Most pollen is used as food for their larvae. Vertebrate predators of bees include primates and birds such as bee-eaters; insect predators include beewolves and dragonflies.

Bee pollination is important both ecologically and commercially, and the decline in wild bees has increased the value of pollination by commercially managed hives of honey bees. The analysis of 353 wild bee and hoverfly species across Britain from 1980 to 2013 found the insects have been lost from a quarter of the places they inhabited in 1980.

Human beekeeping or apiculture (meliponiculture for stingless bees) has been practised for millennia, since at least the times of Ancient Egypt and Ancient Greece. Bees have appeared in mythology and folklore, through all phases of art and literature from ancient times to the present day, although primarily focused in the Northern Hemisphere where beekeeping is far more common. In Mesoamerica, the Mayans have practiced large-scale intensive meliponiculture since pre-Columbian times.

Evolution 
The immediate ancestors of bees were stinging wasps in the family Crabronidae, which were predators of other insects. The switch from insect prey to pollen may have resulted from the consumption of prey insects which were flower visitors and were partially covered with pollen when they were fed to the wasp larvae. This same evolutionary scenario may have occurred within the vespoid wasps, where the pollen wasps evolved from predatory ancestors. The oldest non-compression bee fossil is found in New Jersey amber, Cretotrigona prisca, a corbiculate bee of Cretaceous age (~65 mya). A fossil from the early Cretaceous (~100 mya), Melittosphex burmensis, was initially considered "an extinct lineage of pollen-collecting Apoidea sister to the modern bees", but subsequent research has rejected the claim that Melittosphex is a bee, or even a member of the superfamily Apoidea to which bees belong, instead treating the lineage as incertae sedis within the Aculeata. By the Eocene (~45 mya) there was already considerable diversity among eusocial bee lineages.

The highly eusocial corbiculate Apidae appeared roughly 87 Mya, and the Allodapini (within the Apidae) around 53 Mya.
The Colletidae appear as fossils only from the late Oligocene (~25 Mya) to early Miocene.
The Melittidae are known from Palaeomacropis eocenicus in the Early Eocene.
The Megachilidae are known from trace fossils (characteristic leaf cuttings) from the Middle Eocene.
The Andrenidae are known from the Eocene-Oligocene boundary, around 34 Mya, of the Florissant shale.
The Halictidae first appear in the Early Eocene with species found in amber. The Stenotritidae are known from fossil brood cells of Pleistocene age.

Coevolution

The earliest animal-pollinated flowers were shallow, cup-shaped blooms pollinated by insects such as beetles, so the syndrome of insect pollination was well established before the first appearance of bees. The novelty is that bees are specialized as pollination agents, with behavioral and physical modifications that specifically enhance pollination, and are the most efficient pollinating insects. In a process of coevolution, flowers developed floral rewards such as nectar and longer tubes, and bees developed longer tongues to extract the nectar. Bees also developed structures known as scopal hairs and pollen baskets to collect and carry pollen. The location and type differ among and between groups of bees. Most species have scopal hairs on their hind legs or on the underside of their abdomens. Some species in the family Apidae have pollen baskets on their hind legs, while very few lack these and instead collect pollen in their crops. The appearance of these structures drove the adaptive radiation of the angiosperms, and, in turn, bees themselves. Bees coevolved not only with flowers but it is believed that some species coevolved with mites. Some provide tufts of hairs called acarinaria that appear to provide lodgings for mites; in return, it is believed that mites eat fungi that attack pollen, so the relationship in this case may be mutualistic.

Phylogeny

External
This phylogenetic tree is based on Debevic et al, 2012, which used molecular phylogeny to demonstrate that the bees (Anthophila) arose from deep within the Crabronidae, which is therefore paraphyletic. The placement of the Heterogynaidae is uncertain. The small subfamily Mellininae was not included in this analysis.

Internal
This cladogram of the bee families is based on Hedtke et al., 2013, which places the former families Dasypodaidae and Meganomiidae as subfamilies inside the Melittidae. English names, where available, are given in parentheses.

Characteristics

Bees differ from closely related groups such as wasps by having branched or plume-like setae (hairs), combs on the forelimbs for cleaning their antennae, small anatomical differences in limb structure, and the venation of the hind wings; and in females, by having the seventh dorsal abdominal plate divided into two half-plates.

Bees have the following characteristics:

 A pair of large compound eyes which cover much of the surface of the head. Between and above these are three small simple eyes (ocelli) which provide information on light intensity. 
 The antennae usually have 13 segments in males and 12 in females, and are geniculate, having an elbow joint part way along. They house large numbers of sense organs that can detect touch (mechanoreceptors), smell and taste; and small, hairlike mechanoreceptors that can detect air movement so as to "hear" sounds.
 The mouthparts are adapted for both chewing and sucking by having both a pair of mandibles and a long proboscis for sucking up nectar.
 The thorax has three segments, each with a pair of robust legs, and a pair of membranous wings on the hind two segments. The front legs of corbiculate bees bear combs for cleaning the antennae, and in many species the hind legs bear pollen baskets, flattened sections with incurving hairs to secure the collected pollen. The wings are synchronised in flight, and the somewhat smaller hind wings connect to the forewings by a row of hooks along their margin which connect to a groove in the forewing. 
 The abdomen has nine segments, the hindermost three being modified into the sting.

Sociality

Haplodiploid breeding system

According to inclusive fitness theory, organisms can gain fitness not just through increasing their own reproductive output, but also that of close relatives. In evolutionary terms, individuals should help relatives when Cost < Relatedness * Benefit. The requirements for eusociality are more easily fulfilled by haplodiploid species such as bees because of their unusual relatedness structure.

In haplodiploid species, females develop from fertilized eggs and males from unfertilized eggs. Because a male is haploid (has only one copy of each gene), his daughters (which are diploid, with two copies of each gene) share 100% of his genes and 50% of their mother's. Therefore, they share 75% of their genes with each other. This mechanism of sex determination gives rise to what W. D. Hamilton termed "supersisters", more closely related to their sisters than they would be to their own offspring. Workers often do not reproduce, but they can pass on more of their genes by helping to raise their sisters (as queens) than they would by having their own offspring (each of which would only have 50% of their genes), assuming they would produce similar numbers. This unusual situation has been proposed as an explanation of the multiple (at least nine) evolutions of eusociality within Hymenoptera.

Haplodiploidy is neither necessary nor sufficient for eusociality. Some eusocial species such as termites are not haplodiploid. Conversely, all bees are haplodiploid but not all are eusocial, and among eusocial species many queens mate with multiple males, creating half-sisters that share only 25% of each-other's genes. But, monogamy (queens mating singly) is the ancestral state for all eusocial species so far investigated, so it is likely that haplodiploidy contributed to the evolution of eusociality in bees.

Eusociality

Bees may be solitary or may live in various types of communities. Eusociality appears to have originated from at least three independent origins in halictid bees. The most advanced of these are species with eusocial colonies; these are characterised by cooperative brood care and a division of labour into reproductive and non-reproductive adults, plus overlapping generations. This division of labour creates specialized groups within eusocial societies which are called castes. In some species, groups of cohabiting females may be sisters, and if there is a division of labour within the group, they are considered semisocial. The group is called eusocial if, in addition, the group consists of a mother (the queen) and her daughters (workers). When the castes are purely behavioural alternatives, with no morphological differentiation other than size, the system is considered primitively eusocial, as in many paper wasps; when the castes are morphologically discrete, the system is considered highly eusocial.

True honey bees (genus Apis, of which eight species are currently recognized) are highly eusocial, and are among the best known insects. Their colonies are established by swarms, consisting of a queen and several thousand workers. There are 29 subspecies of one of these species, Apis mellifera, native to Europe, the Middle East, and Africa. Africanized bees are a hybrid strain of A. mellifera that escaped from experiments involving crossing European and African subspecies; they are extremely defensive.

Stingless bees are also highly eusocial. They practise mass provisioning, with complex nest architecture and perennial colonies also established via swarming.

Many bumblebees are eusocial, similar to the eusocial Vespidae such as hornets in that the queen initiates a nest on her own rather than by swarming. Bumblebee colonies typically have from 50 to 200 bees at peak population, which occurs in mid to late summer. Nest architecture is simple, limited by the size of the pre-existing nest cavity, and colonies rarely last more than a year. In 2011, the International Union for Conservation of Nature set up the Bumblebee Specialist Group to review the threat status of all bumblebee species worldwide using the IUCN Red List criteria.

There are many more species of primitively eusocial than highly eusocial bees, but they have been studied less often. Most are in the family Halictidae, or "sweat bees". Colonies are typically small, with a dozen or fewer workers, on average. Queens and workers differ only in size, if at all. Most species have a single season colony cycle, even in the tropics, and only mated females hibernate. A few species have long active seasons and attain colony sizes in the hundreds, such as Halictus hesperus. Some species are eusocial in parts of their range and solitary in others, or have a mix of eusocial and solitary nests in the same population. The orchid bees (Apidae) include some primitively eusocial species with similar biology. Some allodapine bees (Apidae) form primitively eusocial colonies, with progressive provisioning: a larva's food is supplied gradually as it develops, as is the case in honey bees and some bumblebees.

Solitary and communal bees

Most other bees, including familiar insects such as carpenter bees, leafcutter bees and mason bees are solitary in the sense that every female is fertile, and typically inhabits a nest she constructs herself. There is no division of labor so these nests lack queens and worker bees for these species. Solitary bees typically produce neither honey nor beeswax. 
Bees collect pollen to feed their young, and have the necessary adaptations to do this. However, certain wasp species such as pollen wasps have similar behaviours, and a few species of bee scavenge from carcases to feed their offspring. Solitary bees are important pollinators; they gather pollen to provision their nests with food for their brood. Often it is mixed with nectar to form a paste-like consistency. Some solitary bees have advanced types of pollen-carrying structures on their bodies. Very few species of solitary bee are being cultured for commercial pollination. Most of these species belong to a distinct set of genera which are commonly known by their nesting behavior or preferences, namely: carpenter bees, sweat bees, mason bees, plasterer bees, squash bees, dwarf carpenter bees, leafcutter bees, alkali bees and digger bees.

Most solitary bees are fossorial, digging nests in the ground in a variety of soil textures and conditions, while others create nests in hollow reeds or twigs, or holes in wood. The female typically creates a compartment (a "cell") with an egg and some provisions for the resulting larva, then seals it off. A nest may consist of numerous cells. When the nest is in wood, usually the last (those closer to the entrance) contain eggs that will become males. The adult does not provide care for the brood once the egg is laid, and usually dies after making one or more nests. The males typically emerge first and are ready for mating when the females emerge. Solitary bees are very unlikely to sting (only in self-defense, if ever), and some (esp. in the family Andrenidae) are stingless.

While solitary, females each make individual nests. Some species, such as the European mason bee Hoplitis anthocopoides, and the Dawson's Burrowing bee, Amegilla dawsoni, are gregarious, preferring to make nests near others of the same species, and giving the appearance of being social. Large groups of solitary bee nests are called aggregations, to distinguish them from colonies. In some species, multiple females share a common nest, but each makes and provisions her own cells independently. This type of group is called "communal" and is not uncommon. The primary advantage appears to be that a nest entrance is easier to defend from predators and parasites when multiple females use that same entrance regularly.

Biology

Life cycle

The life cycle of a bee, be it a solitary or social species, involves the laying of an egg, the development through several moults of a legless larva, a pupation stage during which the insect undergoes complete metamorphosis, followed by the emergence of a winged adult. The number of eggs laid by a female during her lifetime can vary from eight or less in some solitary bees, to more than a million in highly social species. Most solitary bees and bumble bees in temperate climates overwinter as adults or pupae and emerge in spring when increasing numbers of flowering plants come into bloom. The males usually emerge first and search for females with which to mate. Like the other members of Hymenoptera bees are haplodiploid; the sex of a bee is determined by whether or not the egg is fertilised. After mating, a female stores the sperm, and determines which sex is required at the time each individual egg is laid, fertilised eggs producing female offspring and unfertilised eggs, males. Tropical bees may have several generations in a year and no diapause stage.

The egg is generally oblong, slightly curved and tapering at one end. Solitary bees, lay each egg in a separate cell with a supply of mixed pollen and nectar next to it. This may be rolled into a pellet or placed in a pile and is known as mass provisioning. Social bee species provision progressively, that is, they feed the larva regularly while it grows. The nest varies from a hole in the ground or in wood, in solitary bees, to a substantial structure with wax combs in bumblebees and honey bees.

In most species, larvae are whitish grubs, roughly oval and bluntly-pointed at both ends. They have 15 segments and spiracles in each segment for breathing. They have no legs but move within the cell, helped by tubercles on their sides. They have short horns on the head, jaws for chewing food and an appendage on either side of the mouth tipped with a bristle. There is a gland under the mouth that secretes a viscous liquid which solidifies into the silk they use to produce a cocoon. The cocoon is semi-transparent and the pupa can be seen through it. Over the course of a few days, the larva undergoes metamorphosis into a winged adult. When ready to emerge, the adult splits its skin dorsally and climbs out of the exuviae and breaks out of the cell.

Flight

Antoine Magnan's 1934 book  says that he and André Sainte-Laguë had applied the equations of air resistance to insects and found that their flight could not be explained by fixed-wing calculations, but that "One shouldn't be surprised that the results of the calculations don't square with reality". This has led to a common misconception that bees "violate aerodynamic theory". In fact it merely confirms that bees do not engage in fixed-wing flight, and that their flight is explained by other mechanics, such as those used by helicopters. In 1996 it was shown that vortices created by many insects' wings helped to provide lift. High-speed cinematography and robotic mock-up of a bee wing showed that lift was generated by "the unconventional combination of short, choppy wing strokes, a rapid rotation of the wing as it flops over and reverses direction, and a very fast wing-beat frequency". Wing-beat frequency normally increases as size decreases, but as the bee's wing beat covers such a small arc, it flaps approximately 230 times per second, faster than a fruitfly (200 times per second) which is 80 times smaller.

Navigation, communication, and finding food

The ethologist Karl von Frisch studied navigation in the honey bee. He showed that honey bees communicate by the waggle dance, in which a worker indicates the location of a food source to other workers in the hive. He demonstrated that bees can recognize a desired compass direction in three different ways: by the sun, by the polarization pattern of the blue sky, and by the earth's magnetic field. He showed that the sun is the preferred or main compass; the other mechanisms are used under cloudy skies or inside a dark beehive. Bees navigate using spatial memory with a "rich, map-like organization".

Digestion 
The gut of bees is relatively simple, but multiple metabolic strategies exist in the gut microbiota. Pollinating bees consume nectar and pollen, which require different digestion strategies by somewhat specialized bacteria. While nectar is a liquid of mostly monosaccharide sugars and so easily absorbed, pollen contains complex polysaccharides: branching pectin and hemicellulose. Approximately five groups of bacteria are involved in digestion. Three groups specialize in simple sugars (Snodgrassella and two groups of Lactobacillus), and two other groups in complex sugars (Gilliamella and Bifidobacterium). Digestion of pectin and hemicellulose is dominated by bacterial clades Gilliamella and Bifidobacterium respectively. Bacteria that cannot digest polysaccharides obtain enzymes from their neighbors, and bacteria that lack certain amino acids do the same, creating multiple ecological niches.

Although most bee species are nectarivorous and palynivorous, some are not. Particularly unusual are vulture bees in the genus Trigona, which consume carrion and wasp brood, turning meat into a honey-like substance.

Ecology

Floral relationships 

Most bees are polylectic (generalist) meaning they collect pollen from a range of flowering plants, but some are oligoleges (specialists), in that they only gather pollen from one or a few species or genera of closely related plants. Specialist pollinators also include bee species which gather floral oils instead of pollen, and male orchid bees, which gather aromatic compounds from orchids (one of the few cases where male bees are effective pollinators). Bees are able to sense the presence of desirable flowers through ultraviolet patterning on flowers, floral odors, and even electromagnetic fields. Once landed, a bee then uses nectar quality and pollen taste to determine whether to continue visiting similar flowers.

In rare cases, a plant species may only be effectively pollinated by a single bee species, and some plants are endangered at least in part because their pollinator is also threatened. But, there is a pronounced tendency for oligolectic bees to be associated with common, widespread plants visited by multiple pollinator species. For example, the creosote bush in the arid parts of the United States southwest is associated with some 40 oligoleges.

As mimics and models

Many bees are aposematically coloured, typically orange and black, warning of their ability to defend themselves with a powerful sting. As such they are models for Batesian mimicry by non-stinging insects such as bee-flies, robber flies and hoverflies, all of which gain a measure of protection by superficially looking and behaving like bees.

Bees are themselves Müllerian mimics of other aposematic insects with the same colour scheme, including wasps, lycid and other beetles, and many butterflies and moths (Lepidoptera) which are themselves distasteful, often through acquiring bitter and poisonous chemicals from their plant food. All the Müllerian mimics, including bees, benefit from the reduced risk of predation that results from their easily recognised warning coloration.

Bees are also mimicked by plants such as the bee orchid which imitates both the appearance and the scent of a female bee; male bees attempt to mate (pseudocopulation) with the furry lip of the flower, thus pollinating it.

As brood parasites

Brood parasites occur in several bee families including the apid subfamily Nomadinae. Females of these species lack pollen collecting structures (the scopa) and do not construct their own nests. They typically enter the nests of pollen collecting species, and lay their eggs in cells provisioned by the host bee. When the "cuckoo" bee larva hatches, it consumes the host larva's pollen ball, and often the host egg also. In particular, the Arctic bee species, Bombus hyperboreus is an aggressive species that attacks and enslaves other bees of the same subgenus. However, unlike many other bee brood parasites, they have pollen baskets and often collect pollen.

In Southern Africa, hives of African honeybees (A. mellifera scutellata) are being destroyed by parasitic workers of the Cape honeybee, A. m. capensis. These lay diploid eggs ("thelytoky"), escaping normal worker policing, leading to the colony's destruction; the parasites can then move to other hives.

The cuckoo bees in the Bombus subgenus Psithyrus are closely related to, and resemble, their hosts in looks and size. This common pattern gave rise to the ecological principle "Emery's rule". Others parasitize bees in different families, like Townsendiella, a nomadine apid, two species of which are cleptoparasites of the dasypodaid genus Hesperapis, while the other species in the same genus attacks halictid bees.

Nocturnal bees 
Four bee families (Andrenidae, Colletidae, Halictidae, and Apidae) contain some species that are crepuscular. Most are tropical or subtropical, but some live in arid regions at higher latitudes. These bees have greatly enlarged ocelli, which are extremely sensitive to light and dark, though incapable of forming images. Some have refracting superposition compound eyes: these combine the output of many elements of their compound eyes to provide enough light for each retinal photoreceptor. Their ability to fly by night enables them to avoid many predators, and to exploit flowers that produce nectar only or also at night.

Predators, parasites and pathogens

Vertebrate predators of bees include bee-eaters, shrikes and flycatchers, which make short sallies to catch insects in flight. Swifts and swallows fly almost continually, catching insects as they go. The honey buzzard attacks bees' nests and eats the larvae. The greater honeyguide interacts with humans by guiding them to the nests of wild bees. The humans break open the nests and take the honey and the bird feeds on the larvae and the wax. Among mammals, predators such as the badger dig up bumblebee nests and eat both the larvae and any stored food.

Specialist ambush predators of visitors to flowers include crab spiders, which wait on flowering plants for pollinating insects; predatory bugs, and praying mantises, some of which (the flower mantises of the tropics) wait motionless, aggressive mimics camouflaged as flowers. Beewolves are large wasps that habitually attack bees; the ethologist Niko Tinbergen estimated that a single colony of the beewolf Philanthus triangulum might kill several thousand honeybees in a day: all the prey he observed were honeybees. Other predatory insects that sometimes catch bees include robber flies and dragonflies. Honey bees are affected by parasites including tracheal and Varroa mites. However, some bees are believed to have a mutualistic relationship with mites.

Some mites of genus Tarsonemus are associated with bees. They live in bee nests and ride on adult bees for dispersal. They are presumed to feed on fungi, nest materials or pollen. However, the impact they have on bees remains uncertain.

Relationship with humans

In mythology and folklore

Homer's Hymn to Hermes describes three bee-maidens with the power of divination and thus speaking truth, and identifies the food of the gods as honey. Sources associated the bee maidens with Apollo and, until the 1980s, scholars followed Gottfried Hermann (1806) in incorrectly identifying the bee-maidens with the Thriae. Honey, according to a Greek myth, was discovered by a nymph called Melissa ("Bee"); and honey was offered to the Greek gods from Mycenean times. Bees were also associated with the Delphic oracle and the prophetess was sometimes called a bee.

The image of a community of honey bees has been used from ancient to modern times, in Aristotle and Plato; in Virgil and Seneca; in Erasmus and Shakespeare; Tolstoy, and by political and social theorists such as Bernard Mandeville and Karl Marx as a model for human society. In English folklore, bees would be told of important events in the household, in a custom known as "Telling the bees".

In art and literature

Some of the oldest examples of bees in art are rock paintings in Spain which have been dated to 15,000 BC.

W. B. Yeats's poem The Lake Isle of Innisfree (1888) contains the couplet "Nine bean rows will I have there, a hive for the honey bee, / And live alone in the bee loud glade." At the time he was living in Bedford Park in the West of London. Beatrix Potter's illustrated book The Tale of Mrs Tittlemouse (1910) features Babbity Bumble and her brood (pictured). Kit Williams' treasure hunt book The Bee on the Comb (1984) uses bees and beekeeping as part of its story and puzzle. Sue Monk Kidd's The Secret Life of Bees (2004), and the 2009 film starring Dakota Fanning, tells the story of a girl who escapes her abusive home and finds her way to live with a family of beekeepers, the Boatwrights.

The 2007 animated comedy film Bee Movie used Jerry Seinfeld's first script and was his first work for children; he starred as a bee named Barry B. Benson, alongside Renée Zellweger. Critics found its premise awkward and its delivery tame. Dave Goulson's A Sting in the Tale (2014) describes his efforts to save bumblebees in Britain, as well as much about their biology. The playwright Laline Paull's fantasy The Bees (2015) tells the tale of a hive bee named Flora 717 from hatching onwards.

Beekeeping

Humans have kept honey bee colonies, commonly in hives, for millennia. Beekeepers collect honey, beeswax, propolis, pollen, and royal jelly from hives; bees are also kept to pollinate crops and to produce bees for sale to other beekeepers.

Depictions of humans collecting honey from wild bees date to 15,000 years ago; efforts to domesticate them are shown in Egyptian art around 4,500 years ago. Simple hives and smoke were used; jars of honey were found in the tombs of pharaohs such as Tutankhamun. From the 18th century, European understanding of the colonies and biology of bees allowed the construction of the moveable comb hive so that honey could be harvested without destroying the colony. Among Classical Era authors, beekeeping with the use of smoke is described in Aristotle's History of Animals Book 9.

Beekeeping is described in detail by Virgil in his Georgics; it is also mentioned in his Aeneid, and in Pliny's Natural History.

As commercial pollinators

Bees play an important role in pollinating flowering plants, and are the major type of pollinator in many ecosystems that contain flowering plants. It is estimated that one third of the human food supply depends on pollination by insects, birds and bats, most of which is accomplished by bees, whether wild or domesticated. Over the last half century, there has been a general decline in the species richness of wild bees and other pollinators, probably attributable to stress from increased parasites and disease, the use of pesticides, and a general decrease in the number of wild flowers. Climate change probably exacerbates the problem.

Contract pollination has overtaken the role of honey production for beekeepers in many countries. After the introduction of Varroa mites, feral honey bees declined dramatically in the US, though their numbers have since recovered. The number of colonies kept by beekeepers declined slightly, through urbanization, systematic pesticide use, tracheal and Varroa mites, and the closure of beekeeping businesses. In 2006 and 2007 the rate of attrition increased, and was described as colony collapse disorder. In 2010 invertebrate iridescent virus and the fungus Nosema ceranae were shown to be in every killed colony, and deadly in combination. Winter losses increased to about 1/3. Varroa mites were thought to be responsible for about half the losses.

Apart from colony collapse disorder, losses outside the US have been attributed to causes including pesticide seed dressings, using neonicotinoids such as clothianidin, imidacloprid and thiamethoxam. From 2013 the European Union restricted some pesticides to stop bee populations from declining further. In 2014 the Intergovernmental Panel on Climate Change report warned that bees faced increased risk of extinction because of global warming. In 2018 the European Union decided to ban field use of all three major neonicotinoids; they remain permitted in veterinary, greenhouse, and vehicle transport usage.

Farmers have focused on alternative solutions to mitigate these problems. By raising native plants, they provide food for native bee pollinators like Lasioglossum vierecki and L. leucozonium, leading to less reliance on honey bee populations.

As food producers
Honey is a natural product produced by bees and stored for their own use, but its sweetness has always appealed to humans. Before domestication of bees was even attempted, humans were raiding their nests for their honey. Smoke was often used to subdue the bees and such activities are depicted in rock paintings in Spain dated to 15,000 BC.

Honey bees are used commercially to produce honey. They also produce some substances used as dietary supplements with possible health benefits, pollen, propolis, and royal jelly, though all of these can also cause allergic reactions.

As food
Bees are considered edible insects. People in some countries eat insects, including the larvae and pupae of bees, mostly stingless species. They also gather larvae, pupae and surrounding cells, known as bee brood, for consumption. In the Indonesian dish botok tawon from Central and East Java, bee larvae are eaten as a companion to rice, after being mixed with shredded coconut, wrapped in banana leaves, and steamed.

Bee brood (pupae and larvae) although low in calcium, has been found to be high in protein and carbohydrate, and a useful source of phosphorus, magnesium, potassium, and trace minerals iron, zinc, copper, and selenium. In addition, while bee brood was high in fat, it contained no fat soluble vitamins (such as A, D, and E) but it was a good source of most of the water-soluble B vitamins including choline as well as vitamin C. The fat was composed mostly of saturated and monounsaturated fatty acids with 2.0% being polyunsaturated fatty acids.

As alternative medicine 
Apitherapy is a branch of alternative medicine that uses honey bee products, including raw honey, royal jelly, pollen, propolis, beeswax and apitoxin (Bee venom). The claim that apitherapy treats cancer, which some proponents of apitherapy make, remains unsupported by evidence-based medicine.

Stings 
The painful stings of bees are mostly associated with the poison gland and the Dufour's gland which are abdominal exocrine glands containing various chemicals. In Lasioglossum leucozonium, the Dufour's Gland mostly contains octadecanolide as well as some eicosanolide. There is also evidence of n-triscosane, n-heptacosane, and 22-docosanolide. However, the secretions of these glands could also be used for nest construction.

See also
 Australian native bees
  Fear of bees (apiphobia)
 Superorganism
 World Bee Day

Explanatory notes

References

External links

 
 "Apoidea" at All Living Thingsimages, identification guides, and maps of bees
 Bee Genera of the World
 Anthophila (Apoidea) – BeesNorth American species of bees at BugGuide
 Native Bees of North America at BugGuide
 "Bee declines driven by combined stress from parasites, pesticides, and lack of flowers"Science

 

Extant Early Cretaceous first appearances